The demographics of the City of Miami are monitored by the U.S. Census Bureau. In 2021, the population was estimated at 439,890 for the City of Miami itself and at 2,662,777 for Miami-Dade County.

Population 
The population of Miami in 2021 was 439,890, within the county of Miami-Dade for 2021, the population was 2,662,777.

The city proper is home to less than one-thirteenth of the population of South Florida. Miami is the 44th most populous city in the United States. The Miami metropolitan area, which includes Miami-Dade, Broward, and Palm Beach counties, has a population of 6.1 million people, ranking eighth largest in the United States.

Growth rate 
The City of Miami's population is in decline, from 2020 to 2021 estimates the population was estimated by the Census Bureau to have declined by −0.5% percent.

Life expectancy 
The life expectancy of the county of Miami-Dade is 82.4 years of age in total in 2019. This differs by ethnic group: non-Hispanic whites have a life expectancy of 80.1, Hispanics 84.2; blacks 77.0 and Asians 91.1.

Fertility 
The highest percentage of births in Miami-Dade County come from women in the age brackets of 30–35.

Age structure 
The median age of Miami-Dade County is 40.2 years.

Gender

Race and ethnicity 

Miami has a minority-majority population, as non-Hispanic whites comprise less than half of the population, 11.5%, down from 41.7% in 1970. Hispanic or Latino (of any race) make up 72.5% of Miami's population. As of the 2020 census, the racial makeup of the population of Miami was 65.4% white American (including white Hispanics), 16.0% black or African-American (including black Hispanics), 1.3% Asian-American, and the remainder belonged to other groups or was of mixed racial ancestry.

In 1960, Hispanics made up about 5% of the population of Miami-Dade County. Between 1960 and 2000, 90% of the population growth in the county was made up of Hispanics, raising the Hispanic portion of the population to more than 57% by 2000.

Country of birth 
The majority of Miami's population is foreign-born. As of 2020, foreign-born residents made up 58.1% of Miami's population. This was slightly more than in Miami-Dade County as a whole, where only 53.6% of the population was foreign-born. 92% of the foreign-born residents of Miami-Dade County were born in Latin America.

Language 
The language demographics of Miami have shifted due to Hispanic migration to the city.

In 2010, 70.2% of Miami's population age five and over spoke only Spanish at home while 22.7% of the population spoke English at home. About 6.3% spoke other Indo-European languages at home. About 0.4% spoke Asian languages or Pacific Islander languages/Oceanic languages at home. The remaining 0.3% of the population spoke other languages at home. In total, 77.3% spoke another language other than English.

In 2016, a total of 73% of Miami's population age five and over spoke a language other than English at home. Of this 73%, 64.5% of the population only spoke Spanish at home while 21.1% of the population spoke English at home. About 7% spoke other Indo-European languages at home, while about 0.9% spoke Asian languages or Pacific Islander languages/Oceanic languages at home. The remaining 0.7% of the population spoke other languages at home.

Religion 
According to a 2014 study by the Pew Research Center, Christianity is the most prevalently practiced religion in the Miami metropolitan area (68%), with 39% professing attendance at a variety of churches that could be considered Protestant, and 27% professing Roman Catholic beliefs. Followed by Judaism (9%); Islam, Buddhism, Hinduism, and a variety of other religions have smaller followings; atheism or no self-identifying organized religious affiliation was practiced by 21%.

A 2011 survey of American Judaism found that Miami-Dade County was less Jewish than the Miami metropolitan area as a whole; only 4.3% of Miami-Dade County residents were Jewish, compared to 15.8% of Palm Beach County residents and 9.8% of Broward County residents.

There has been a Norwegian Seamen's church in Miami since the early 1980s. In November 2011, Crown Princess Mette-Marit opened a new building for the church. The church was built as a center for the 10,000 Scandinavians that live in Florida. Around 4,000 of them are Norwegian. The church is also an important place for the 150 Norwegians that work at Walt Disney World in Central Florida.

Social issues

Marital status 
In 2020, 45% of Miami-Dade County was married with 55% of the county being classified as 'Single'.

References 

Miami
Miami
Miami